The Seattle Film Critics Society Award for Best Documentary Feature is one of the annual awards given by the Seattle Film Critics Society.

Winners and nominees

† indicates the winner of the Academy Award for Best Documentary Feature.

2010s

2020s

References

Documentary Feature